In mathematics, the theta divisor Θ is the divisor in the sense of algebraic geometry defined on an abelian variety A over the complex numbers (and principally polarized) by the zero locus of the associated Riemann theta-function. It is therefore an algebraic subvariety of A of dimension dim A − 1.

Classical theory

Classical results of Bernhard Riemann describe Θ in another way, in the case that A is the Jacobian variety J of an algebraic curve (compact Riemann surface) C. There is, for a choice of base point P on C, a standard mapping of C to J, by means of the interpretation of J as the linear equivalence classes of divisors on C of degree 0. That is, Q on C maps to the class of Q − P. Then since J is an algebraic group, C may be added to itself k times on J, giving rise to subvarieties Wk.

If g is the genus of C, Riemann proved that Θ is a translate on J of Wg − 1. He also described which points on Wg − 1 are non-singular: they correspond to the effective divisors D of degree g − 1 with no associated meromorphic functions other than constants. In more classical language, these D do not move in a linear system of divisors on C, in the sense that they do not dominate the polar divisor of a non constant function.

Riemann further proved the Riemann singularity theorem, identifying the multiplicity of a point p = class(D) on Wg − 1 as the number of linearly independent meromorphic functions with pole divisor dominated by D, or equivalently as h0(O(D)), the number of linearly independent global sections of the holomorphic line bundle associated to D as Cartier divisor on C.

Later work

The Riemann singularity theorem was extended by George Kempf in 1973, building on work of David Mumford and Andreotti - Mayer, to a description of the singularities of points p = class(D) on  Wk for 1 ≤ k ≤ g − 1. In particular he computed their multiplicities also in terms of the number of independent meromorphic functions associated to D (Riemann-Kempf singularity theorem).

More precisely, Kempf mapped J locally near p to a family of matrices coming from an exact sequence which computes h0(O(D)), in such a way that Wk corresponds to the locus of matrices of less than maximal rank.  The multiplicity then agrees with that of the point on the corresponding rank locus.  Explicitly, if

h0(O(D)) = r + 1,

the multiplicity of Wk at class(D) is the binomial coefficient

When k = g − 1, this is r + 1, Riemann's formula.

Notes

References
 

Theta functions
Algebraic curves
Bernhard Riemann